Rother FM was a local radio station serving the English town of Rotherham. The station was on air from 2006 until it was closed in 2020 by owners Bauer so that the frequency could be used to broadcast Greatest Hits Radio Yorkshire.

Studios and coverage
Rother FM was originally based in Rotherham from its studios at Aspen Court in Templeboroug, but later moved to Doncaster as part of cost saving measures. It covered the Rotherham Borough from its transmitter at Boston Castle, although it could easily be heard in neighbouring areas such as Sheffield and Barnsley.

Background
Prior to being awarded the licence by Ofcom, Rother FM broadcast two Restricted Service Licence broadcasts from the Carlton Park Hotel. The station went on to be awarded the full-time licence and launched at 10am on Sunday 15 October 2006 with presenter James Marriott hosting the first show.

It was part of the Lincs FM Group of radio stations and broadcast on the old Hallam FM frequency of 96.1 FM. The station broadcast a mix of current chart music as well as well known tracks from the 1960s, 1970s, 1980s, 1990s and 2000s alongside news, information and competitions.

Imaging
Like the rest of the group, the station used the group strap line of "The difference is..." and has jingles sung by the radio ident company S2blue.

Closure
Lincs FM Group was purchased by Bauer Radio in February 2019 and eighteen months later, most of the group's remaining stations including Rother FM, were rebranded as Greatest Hits Radio.

Rother Radio on DAB+
After the original station became a Greatest Hits Radio station, Rotherham Broadcasting set up a new DAB+ station called Rother Radio on the Shefcast Digital multiplex, broadcasting to listeners in Rotherham and Sheffield. This station was joined by a rival station called Rotherham Radio (formally RB1) in March 2023, owned by the firm behind TX1 Radio in Doncaster.

References

External links
 
 Recording jingles for Lincs FM Group at S2 Blue in Leek
 Lincs FM group website
 Media UK entry

Radio stations established in 2006
Radio stations in Yorkshire
Rotherham
Bauer Radio